This is a list of the first-level administrative divisions of the People's Republic of China (P.R.C.), including all provinces, autonomous regions, special administrative regions and municipalities, in order of their life expectancy in 2019.

See also
List of Chinese cities by life expectancy
 List of Asian countries by life expectancy

References
  
 National Bureau of Statistics of the People's Republic of China 
 The World FactBook 
 List of Chinese cities by life expectancy

Life expectancy
Life expectancy
Life expectancy
China, life expectancy
China
China health-related lists